The Central Line is a commuter rail service in Cape Town, South Africa, operated by Metrorail Western Cape. Central Line services operate along two routes from central Cape Town to Langa, and then along three branches from Langa to various areas in the south-east of the city. The first branch runs to Mitchell's Plain, the second to Khayelitsha, and the third passes through Belhar to terminate in Bellville.

Route
Central Line trains depart from Cape Town station on one of two routes. The first route runs along the original Cape Town–Bellville main line through Salt River to Maitland, and then branches south to pass around the western and southern edge of Pinelands to Langa station. The other route runs along the relief main line past Paarden Eiland and then branches south through Kensington to Mutual station; from Mutual it runs along the eastern edge of Pinelands to Langa.

From Langa station all trains pass through Bonteheuwel station; some continue east through Bishop Lavis and Belhar, passing the University of the Western Cape before turning north and then west to terminate at Bellville. Other trains branch south after Bonteheuwel, passing Manenberg and Gugulethu to Philippi station. From Philippi, one branch passes south through Mitchell's Plain to terminate at Kapteinsklip station, while the other passes south-east through Khayelitsha to terminate at Chris Hani station.

Most trains to Mitchell's Plain use the Salt River route from Cape Town to Langa, while most trains to Bellville or Khayelitsha use the Mutual route, but there are some exceptions.

Station listing
The Central Line serves the following stations:

Operation
The line is made up of  track, electrified with 3,000 V DC overhead catenary; all parts of the line are at least double track. Services are operated mostly by electric multiple units of Class 5M2 and (on the Khayelitsha line) Class 8M.

Current situation
After 2011, PRASA was increasingly unable to maintain the line  and the Khayelitsha line ceased operation in 2019 due to vandalism and metal theft.  More recently, plans to reopen it have been thwarted by squatters occupying the railway territory. It is proposed to re-open the line by December 2022, though many previous deadlines have been missed. Rail workers attempting to restore the line have been assaulted by armed gangs.

References

Metrorail (South Africa)
Railway lines in South Africa
3 ft 6 in gauge railways in South Africa